The 2013–14 VfL Bochum season is the 76th season in club history.

Review and events
During the winter break, the club mourned the death of long-time general manager Klaus Hilpert, who died on 20 January 2014.

Matches

Legend

Friendly matches

2. Bundesliga

League fixtures and results

DFB-Pokal

Squad

Squad and statistics

Squad, appearances and goals scored

|}

Transfers

Summer

In:

Out:

Winter

In:

Out:

Sources

External links
 2013–14 VfL Bochum season at Weltfussball.de 
 2013–14 VfL Bochum season at kicker.de 
 2013–14 VfL Bochum season at Fussballdaten.de 

Bochum
VfL Bochum seasons